Quarterdeck Ridge is the undulating, north–south snow crest of Hallett Peninsula. For the most part this crest is very close to the great 1,500 meter Cotter Cliffs that fall abruptly to the Ross Sea. The range was so named by the New Zealand Geological Survey Antarctic Expedition (NZGSAE), 1957–58, because impressions obtained in traversing along it recall those in walking the quarterdeck of a ship.

See also
Heave-ho Slope

References

Ridges of Victoria Land
Borchgrevink Coast